The KV-13 (Russian: KB-13) was an experimental Soviet medium tank created during World War II. It was developed on the KV-1 chassis in the SKB-2 design bureau of the Chelyabinsk Kirov Plant in late 1941 – early 1942, as a "universal" tank, intended to replace the production of T-34 medium tanks and KV-1 heavy tanks at the same time.

Development 

The first prototype of the KV-13 was made in the spring of 1942, but in the fall of that year tests showed a lack of mechanical reliability and demonstrated the need to strengthen the vehicle's armour and to equip it with the new three-seat turret. While production of two modified prototypes incorporating these modifications began in December 1942, work on the KV-13 as a medium tank was discontinued in favour of continuing the production of the T-34. The further development of the project using two modified KV-13 prototypes led to the creation in 1943 of the IS-1 heavy tank. This tank was never used in combat.

References

Bibliography 

 
 
 
 

Medium tanks of the Soviet Union
Heavy tanks of the Soviet Union
World War II tanks of the Soviet Union
World War II medium tanks
World War II heavy tanks
Trial and research tanks of the Soviet Union
Chelyabinsk Tractor Plant products
Abandoned military projects of the Soviet Union